Bellura gortynoides, the white-tailed diver, is a species of cutworm or dart moth in the family Noctuidae. It is found in North America.

The MONA or Hodges number for Bellura gortynoides is 9523.

References

Further reading

External links

 

Noctuinae
Articles created by Qbugbot
Moths described in 1865